An anti-victim is an individual who proactively develops and uses protective and problem-solving behaviors to prevent, avoid, and prepare to act against violent or abusive encounters. Anti-victimists main concern is to look at people's 'victim-mentality' which is when someone blames others instead of taking responsibility for their actions.

History
The first known published use of the term "anti-victim" was by Peg Flandreau West (1928–1991) in the book Protective Behaviors: Anti-Victim Training for Kids published in 1983.

According to Madison.com, Peg West was "a social worker in the Madison public schools who developed a program called Protective Behaviors Inc. which provided a way for children to report abuse. The program, based on principles that said we all have a right to feel safe and that nothing is so awful that you can't talk about it with someone you trust, was widely adopted in Australia and is credited with revolutionizing child welfare practices there".

In 2008, the term was included in the My Security Sense presentation and community education program created by Anti-Victim.Org. The program uniquely focuses on the two most significant methods of self-protection: awareness and a preparedness to act. The goals of the program are to provide a foundation for turning off "auto-pilot" in everyday situations and to provide a foundation for being mentally and physically prepared to act to avoid being targeted by criminals and to reduce the potential of becoming a victim of violent crime.

Protective behaviors

The idea for the Protective Behaviors program was first conceived when Peg Flandreau West went to speak to a group of students about being safe. Some popular protective factors an individual may display is that of an intolerant attitude towards deviance, they may have a high IQ, high education aspirations, high social status, and may have highly developed social competence. For social protective factors, people may be possessive of affective relationships, a strong commitment to school, and may have firm disciplinary methods.

Anti-Victim.Org

Anti-Victim.Org was founded in 2008 with the primary goal of helping women develop and enhance their sense of personal security by offering awareness education and facilitating discussions in living rooms, work places, libraries, college dormitories, sororities, civic clubs, and other group meetings in local communities.

Alternate meanings
The term "anti-victim" can also be used to identify an individual or group that is perceived to be against victims. This type of reference is often associated with political positions where the anti-victim is an opponent of victims' rights legislation or court rulings.

References

External links
 Anti-Victim.Org
 Protective Behaviors International

Popular psychology